Charlie Bean may refer to:

Charlie Bean (economist) (born 1953), British economist
Charlie Bean (filmmaker) (born 1970), American animator and film director

See also
Charles Bean (1879–1968), Australian World War I war correspondent and historian